The British Society for Population Studies, is a learned society in the United Kingdom dedicated to promoting the scientific study of biological, economic, historical, medical, social and other disciplines connected with human populations. It is a member of the Academy of Social Sciences.

According to Pauline M. H. Mazumdar, "the British Population Society was formed in 1929. It was a small group of twenty, mainly distinguished academics: economists, statisticians, sociologists and biologists. Fourteen of the twenty were members of the Eugenics Society: their high academic status emphasises the high standing of the Eugenics Society among intellectuals. The Chairman was Sir Bernard Mallet, KCB, Registrar-General from 1909 to 1920, President of the Royal Statistical Society and President of the Eugenics Society; other members of the Eugenics Society included the statistician R.A.Fisher, the biologist Julian Huxley, the economist J.M.Keynes, the anthropologist G.L.F.Pitt-Rivers, and the sociologist A.M.Carr-Saunders, a ViceChairman of the Society. Those not members of the Eugenics Society included Sir William Beveridge, the Director of the London School of Economics, and Bronislaw Malinowski, the anthropologist.

The British Population Society had its offices within the Eugenics Society’s rooms. It was affiliated with the International Union for the Scientific Investigation of Population Problems, whose headquarters were at the Institute for Biological Research at Johns Hopkins University in Baltimore, but whose Chairman was the animal geneticist Frank A.E.Crew of Edinburgh, a member of the British group and of the Eugenics Society."

External links

References

Learned societies of the United Kingdom
Scientific organisations based in the United Kingdom
Academic organisations based in the United Kingdom